Blue Plate Special may refer to:
 Blue-plate special, a low-priced restaurant meal
 Damon Runyon's Blue Plate Special, 1934 short story collection by Damon Runyon
 Blue Plate Special: An Autobiography of My Appetites, a 2013 memoir by Kate Christensen
 Blue Plate Specials Live, a 1999 ska album by the Specials
 Blue Plate Special (Prairie Oyster album), 1996
 Blue Plate Special (Will Bernard album), 2008